Ligur may refer to:
 Roman cognomen
 Ligur (shrimp), an arthropod genus in the family Lysmatidae
 Ligures (singular Ligus or Ligur; English: Ligurians, Greek: Λίγυες), an ancient people who gave their name to Liguria

See also
Liger